Niusha is a feminine given name of Persian origin. Notable people with the name include:

Niusha Mancilla (born 1971), Bolivian runner
Niusha Zeighami (born 1980), Iranian actress, model, and makeup artist

Persian feminine given names